"Oxygène (Part IV)" (released in some countries under the title "Oxygène IV") is a 1977 single composed by the French electronic musician and composer Jean-Michel Jarre, from his third studio album Oxygène (1976). It is Jarre's most successful single, reaching number four on the UK Singles Chart and peaking in the top ten in the charts of several European countries. It also was used in the 2008 video game Grand Theft Auto IV, and in the BBC drama Micro Men.

Background 
In 1972, the American synth-pop band Hot Butter released a successful version of Gershon Kingsley's "Popcorn". That same year he recorded on French label, Disques Motors and released his respective version under the pseudonyms Pop Corn Orchestra and Jammie Jeferson. It although was not successful, the track served as inspiration for the creation of "Oxygène (Part IV)".

In 1974, he composed the opening jingle for the A4 autoroute—also known as autoroute de l'Est—in Paris, some media such as The Telegraph pointed out the rumors of the possible original incarnation of "Oxygène (Part IV)" in the jingle.

Composition and recording 
Like the rest of the Oxygène album, "Oxygène (Part IV)" was recorded in the makeshift studio in Jarre's kitchen in his Paris apartment, using several instruments such as the RMI Harmonic Synthesizer. "Oxygene (Part IV)" begins with a sound that evokes the wind, a flat noise generated by an English synthesizer called EMS VCS 3, the first synthesizer that Jarre had. 

In the middle of this white noise, Jarre superimposes different musical sequences, among them are two presets "rock" and "slow rock" played simultaneously by using sellotape to hold down multiple selections on a Korg Mini-Pops 7 drum machine. He also added filtering effects to the drum sounds "in a very subtle way to give life inside the patterns." The "ethereal string sounds" were created by running the VCS 3 and Eminent 310 Unique through an Electro Harmonix Small Stone phase pedal for  guitars. French sound engineer, Michel Geiss programmed in the ARP 2600 the main sound of "Oxygène (Part IV)". Jarre also used a Revox tape to create delay on some sounds.

Release and critical reception 
On its release as a single, "Oxygene (Part IV)" reached number four on the UK Singles Chart and reached the top ten in several other countries across Europe and in New Zealand. It began to play on the most important radio stations in his native country and Great Britain. Europe 1 used it as the theme of two of his regular programs, Hit Parade directed by Jean-Loup Lafont and basketball show Basket sur Europe 1 in the credit titles. BBC Radio 1 also played the entire album, including it. In 1989, it was remixed and re-released, with a music video which features a penguin march on Antarctica.

The song was chosen as fifth greatest synth sound of all time by English magazine Computer Music in MusicRadar website. The British newspaper The Guardian called it Jarre's best oeuvre and described as "an instantly recognisable hook that rides on a bossa nova beat to explore the galaxies". Treble considered it as one of the most essential synth pop songs in history. Phil Alexander wrote in Mojo which "the composer's pop sensibilites evident on Oxygene Part IV – an unlikely UK Top 5 hit from what remains an elegant cornerstone of electronic music."

Charts

Weekly charts

Year-end charts

References

Bibliography 
 

1970s songs
1976 songs
1977 singles
Electronic songs
French electronic songs
Ambient songs
Synth-pop songs
New wave songs
Instrumentals